Robert Reynolds may refer to:

 Robert Reynolds (American football) (born 1981), former American football linebacker
 Robert Reynolds (Attorney General) (1601–1678), English lawyer and Member of Parliament
 Robert Reynolds (gymnast) (1881-1955), American Olympic gymnast
 Robert Reynolds (National Youth Rights Association), president of the association
 Robert Carthew Reynolds (1745–1811), Royal Navy admiral
 Robert J. Reynolds (1838–1909), American politician, governor of Delaware
 Robert L. Reynolds (1902–1966), American historian
 Robert Rice Reynolds (1884–1963), American senator
 Rob Reynolds (journalist), US journalist, correspondent for Al Jazeera
 Rob Reynolds (musician) (born 1967), singer-songwriter
 H. Robert Reynolds (born 1934), American conductor and composer

See also
 Bobby Reynolds (born 1982), American tennis player
 Bobby Reynolds (American football) (1931–1985), American football player
 Bobby Reynolds (ice hockey) (born 1967), professional ice hockey player
 Sentry (Robert Reynolds), Marvel Comics character
 Bob Reynolds (disambiguation)